Edvárd Rusák (born 6 April 1994 in Senta) is a Hungarian football player who currently plays for Gyirmót.

Club statistics

Updated to games played as of 15 May 2022.

References
Profile at MLSZ 

1994 births
Living people
People from Senta
Hungarians in Vojvodina
Hungarian footballers
Association football goalkeepers
Kaposvári Rákóczi FC players
Gyirmót FC Győr players
Nemzeti Bajnokság I players
Nemzeti Bajnokság II players
Serbian emigrants to Hungary